Mordellistena inexpectata is a species of beetle in the family Mordellidae. It is in the genus Mordellistena. It was described in 1967 by Ermisch, and is found in Germany.

References

inexpectata
Endemic fauna of Germany
Beetles described in 1967